Miroslav Bedřich Böhnel (3 July 1886 – 23 September 1962) was a Czech writer. His work was part of the literature event in the art competition at the 1932 Summer Olympics.

References

1886 births
1962 deaths
20th-century Czech writers
Czech male writers
Olympic competitors in art competitions
Writers from Brno